Jean-Pierre Sabouret (4 December 1944 – 25 April 2007) was a French classical violinist.

Career 
Winner of several international awards ( in 1963, Golden Medal of the Maria Canals International Music Competition of Barcelone in 1964), Sabouret was invited by many orchestras in France and abroad. A member of prestigious chamber music ensembles including the Loewenguth Quartet, he later joined the Via Nova Quartet.

A soloist of the Contemporary classical music "Ensemble l'Itinéraire" for ten years, then of the Orchestre philharmonique de Strasbourg (1974-1976), he joined the orchestra of the Paris Opera in 1977, where he became violin solo. He held these positions until 2006.

A pedagogue, he founded a music school in Ablon-sur-Seine in the Paris region. He was also professor of violin and chamber music at the Conservatory of Athis-Mons (Essonne), then at the Paul-Dukas Conservatory (12th arrondissement of Paris). Finally, he spent a few years as an assistant professor at the Conservatoire de Paris.

References

External links 
 Jean-Pierre Sabouret interview (Lamirésol)
 Saint-Saëns' First sonata, Mvt 2 - Jean-Pierre Sabouret and Alain Raës (YouTube)

20th-century French male classical violinists
1944 births
2007 deaths